The 2021 Ferrari Challenge Asia-Pacific is the 10th season of Ferrari Challenge competition in the Asia-Pacific region. The season consists of three rounds, starting at the Mugello Circuit on November 16 and concluded at the Dubai Autodrome on January 14 2022.

Calendar

Entry list
All teams and drivers used the Ferrari 488 Challenge Evo fitted with Pirelli tyres.

Results and standings

Race results

Championship standings

References

External links
 Official website
 Official Ferrari APAC Challenge website

Asia-Pacific 2021
Ferrari Challenge Asia-Pacific
Ferrari Challenge Asia-Pacific